Dora Greenwell (6 December 1821 – 29 March 1882) was an English poet. The name "Dora Greenwell" was for many years supposed to be the pseudonym of a writer of rare spiritual insight and fine poetic genius. It was very generally surmised that she was a member of the Society of Friends; and there was much ground for this supposition. As time wore on, and book followed book, some of the facts of her personal history became known and were occasionally referred to in the public press. But for a very long period little was really known of her actual life, and many mistakes gained currency.

Her poem, "I Am Not Skilled to Understand" was set to music by William J. Kirkpatrick. A contemporary version of it, "My Savior My God", is a 2006 radio single by contemporary Christian musician, Aaron Shust, from his album, Anything Worth Saying.

Early years
Dorothy ("Dora") Greenwell was born 6 December 1821 at the family estate called Greenwell Ford in Lanchester, County Durham, England. Her father was William Thomas Greenwell (1777–1856), a respected and popular magistrate and deputy lieutenant. Her mother was Dorothy Smales (1789–1871). She was known as Dora to avoid confusion with her mother. Her oldest brother was William Greenwell (1820–1918), an archaeologist. She had three younger brothers: Francis Greenwell (1823–1894), Alan Greenwell (1824–1914) and Henry Nicholas Greenwell (1826–1891). Two of her brothers were clergymen of the Church of England, one of them being a Minor Canon of Durham Cathedral. She herself also belonged to the same church.

Career
Sad reverses befell the household of Greenwell Ford in the year 1848, when, owing no doubt to mismanagement, the property had to be sold. For a time thereafter, Greenwell, with her father and mother, resided at Ovingham Rectory, in Northumberland, where her eldest brother, William, was holding the living for a friend. It was while she lived in this village, in 1848, that she issued her earliest volume of poems, which was published by William Pickering and extended to a little over two hundred pages. The reception which it met with led to the issue of a second volume in 1850.

After leaving Ovingham, she had no settled home for some time, but lived principally, until 1854, with her brother, the Rev. Alan Greenwell, at Golbourne Rectory, in Lancashire. When Greenwell left the Lancashire rectory for her native county, she was 33 years old.
She moved to Durham with her brother William who would later become Canon of Durham Cathedral. After a short time working with her brother Alan who was Rector of Golborne, she moved back to Durham and lived with her mother amongst many friends and relatives—her father having died in 1854. Now began the period of her greatest intellectual efforts. Her correspondence during these years was fraught with so much interest that it was easy to discover in it the germs of many of her profoundest writings. She was destined to become an accomplished essayist, and to produce some prose works which claimed a very high place among books of a deeply thoughtful and spiritual kind.

Her major success came in the 1860s. In 1861, Alexander Strahan & Co., of Edinburgh, issued a volume of her poetry which included some of the earlier poems; and in 1867 the same publisher brought out a new volume with the earlier poems left out and some later ones taking their place. During some seven or eight years, Greenwell wrote some poems which were finally published by Bell and Daldy, with the title, Carolina Crucis. The Soul's Legend, and Camera Obscura, two small volumes, were published respectively in 1873 and 1876.

Many works had Christian religious themes. She was often compared to Christina Rossetti, and dedicated a book to Elizabeth Barrett Browning. In addition to poetry, she wrote essays on women's education and suffrage, and attacked the slave trade.
Some of her verses were set to music as hymns, such as "I Am Not Skilled to Understand" by William J. Kirkpatrick. A contemporary version was composed by Aaron Shust. She also wrote biographies of French priest Jean-Baptiste Henri Lacordaire and American Quaker John Woolman.

Greenwell made her home in Durham for eighteen years. This home was broken up at her mother's death in 1871. She visited friends for a few years in Torquay and Clifton, and then moved to London in 1874. In the autumn of 1881, she went to her brother, Alan Greenwell at Clifton, Bristol, much weakened in health, and suffering from the results of an accident. She failed rapidly in the following spring. She died on the evening of Wednesday, 29 March 1882, and was buried in Arnos Vale Cemetery in Bristol.

A Woodland Trust woodland close to her birthplace of Lanchester is named Dora's Wood in her honour.

Selected works

 
 
 
 
 
 
 
 
Selected Poems from the Writings of Dora Greenwell with an introduction by Constance L. Maynard, H.R.Allenson, London 1906

References

Attribution

Bibliography

Further reading

External links

 
 
 

1821 births
1882 deaths
19th-century English poets
19th-century English women writers
19th-century English writers
19th-century British writers
English women poets
People from Lanchester, County Durham